The 1978 Society of West End Theatre Awards were held in 1978 in London celebrating excellence in West End theatre by the Society of West End Theatre. The awards would not become the Laurence Olivier Awards, as they are known today, until the 1984 ceremony.

Winners and nominees
Details of winners (in bold) and nominees, in each award category, per the Society of London Theatre.

Productions with multiple nominations and awards
The following 16 productions received multiple nominations:

 4: Evita
 3: Annie, Filumena and The Double Dealer
 2: Brand, Coriolanus, Half-Life, Henry VI, Lark Rise, Plenty, Shut Your Eyes and Think of England, The Homecoming, The Woman, Twelfth Night, Waters of the Moon and Whose Life Is It Anyway

The following three productions received multiple awards:

 2: Evita, Filumena and Whose Life Is It Anyway

See also
 32nd Tony Awards

References

External links
 Previous Olivier Winners – 1978

Laurence Olivier Awards ceremonies
Laurence Olivier Awards, 1978
1978 in London
1978 awards in the United Kingdom